Shipwrecked: The Island is a British reality television series and is the second revival of the Shipwrecked format. The 2011–12 series is the eighth overall in the Shipwrecked series. The Island has a different format from the Battle of the Islands series, consisting of only one tribe of 10 people living together on one island.

The revival of the series was announced by Channel 4 on 19 May 2011 with a 15-episode run and a back-to-basics theme, instead of Battle of the Islands, confirmed. Casting took place over the following months; with filming taking place between August and October 2011.

The series began on 23 October 2011 and was aired at 8pm on Tuesdays on E4 until 31 January 2012, there was no episode broadcast on 20 December 2011.

Contestants

Voting history

Key:
 This contestant was the winner and won £5,000
 This contestant was voted Island Leader

Notes

 Danni was given a bead in Week 4 by new arrival Ashlie as part of her introductory task.
 In week 5, Joseph lost his right to vote for removing his necklace which was against island rules.
 In the week 5 re-vote, Kitten had no need to vote as a majority decision had already been made making Dominique the new Island Leader.
 In the week 6 vote, Danni was not required to vote as a majority decision had already been made making Kate the new Island Leader.
 In week 7 the new arrivals, Carl and Salema had the power to take someone's necklace, they took Kate's and Anna's respectively. Week 7 also saw the start of a new twist. The outgoing leader now has the power to take someone's bead, who they think is undeserving and give it to someone who they think is deserving. Kate took Kitten's bead and gave it to Ashlie.
In week 8, Bear took Danni's bead and gave it to Anna. As the first act of his leadership, Carl had to pick three people to send to the "other island" on a raft the next morning for 48 hours where they would have a decision to make - take and allocate three red beads or take a box containing luxury items. He chose Anna, Brimes and Joe.
In week 9, Ashlie, Danni, Kate and Tristan were not required to vote as there was already a majority. Carl took Tristan's bead and gave it to Ashlie, due to him not taking part in Carl's week. Also, due to a rule-break when Bear and Dominique swum to the "other island" to meet Anna and Brimes, Carl had the power to reallocate their beads, giving them to Kate and Danni respectively.
In week 10, Carl was not required to vote as there was already a majority. Tristan took one of Carl's beads and gave it to Bear.
In week 11, Carl, Danni and Kate were not required to vote as there was already a majority. Dominique took one of Carl's beads and gave it to Brimes.
In week 12, Only three people - Ashlie, Danni and Salema were eligible to stand as only people who had not been leader already could stand. Ashlie, Carl and Salema were not required to vote as there was already a majority. Anna took one of Ashlie's beads and gave it to Bear.
In week 13, Tristan found a lighter - an explicitly banned item on Shipwrecked - in Bear's bag, for which Bear was required to give up one of his beads. In the final vote, each person's beads corresponded to their number of initial shells. Only people who had been leader were eligible to win, which meant that Salema was the only person who could not win. Ashlie as outgoing leader was required to take a shell from someone and reallocate it - she chose Tristan to lose his shell and gave it to Kate. Salema was required to give her shell away as she was ineligible to win - she also gave it to Kate.
After 13 weeks on the island Kate became the winner with 5 red beads.

References

External links
 Official website

British reality television series
2011 British television seasons
Channel 4 reality television shows
E4 (TV channel) original programming
Television shows filmed in the Cook Islands